Heartbeat (French: Le schpountz) is a 1938 French comedy film directed by Marcel Pagnol and starring Fernandel, Orane Demazis and Fernand Charpin. It was remade in 1999 as Le schpountz, directed by Gérard Oury.

It tells the story of an unhappy young grocer's assistant who dreams of becoming a grand dramatic actor, but when he gatecrashes a film studio they realise he is a natural comic.

Plot
Irénée lives and works in the little grocery shop of his childless uncle, who brought him up, and dreams of becoming a famous and rich film actor with an exotic car. One day a film crew stops in the village and he attempts to interest them in his undiscovered talents. They play along with his obsession, calling him the village idiot or schpountz, and even give him a fake contract. His uncle ridicules his naïvety and the sympathetic Françoise, a member of the team, warns him not to take it seriously. But Irénée withdraws his savings and, taking a train to Paris, arrives at the studio, from which he is repeatedly thrown out. Taking pity on him, Françoise gets him a job as a props assistant.

However the jokers who first ensnared him then use him in another trick to ruin the take of a pompous actor, Galubert, under an even more pompous director. Sending him on to the set results in chaos, but some realise that he is actually funny rather than pitiable and he is given a part. The film is a success, with the public preferring the comedy of Irénée to the grandeur of Galubert. The head of the studio gives him a real contract, which he will not sign until he also gets a Peugeot 601 Éclipse convertible, and on the strength of this he proposes to Françoise. Once married, the two drive down to his uncle's village, where he enters the shop alone in the clothes in which he left, telling his uncle that his dream of fame has proved false and asking to come home again. The uncle is delighted to be proved right, and Irénée then brings in his wife. The uncle is delighted to have someone else to work in the shop, until Irénée tells him to look at the car outside and so reveals the truth.

Cast
 Fernandel as Irénée Fabre, 'le Schpountz'  
 Orane Demazis as Françoise  
 Fernand Charpin as L'oncle Baptiste Fabre (as Charpin)  
 Léon Belières as Meyerboom  
 Enrico Glori as Bodigar Glazunoff  
 Robert Vattier as Astruc  
 Marcel Maupi as Le barman  
 Louisard as Charlet  
 Henri Poupon as Galubert  
 Robert Bassac as Dromart  
 Charles Blavette as Martelette 
 Jean Castan as Casimir Fabre  
 André Pollack as L'avoué  
 Charblay as Adolphe, le portier du studio  
 Tyrand as Le pape  
 Jacques B. Brunius as L'accessoiriste  
 Henri Champetier as Nick  
 Roger Forster as Lucien  
 Beretta as Le chef de plateau  
 Jean Weber as Le cantinier  
 Alida Rouffe as Grocery Customer  
 Alice Robert as Rita Camelia  
 Odette Roger as La tante Clarisse Fabre 
 Pierre Brasseur as Cousine  
 Robert Darène as Un aide  
 Louis Ducreux 
 Geo Forster as Cousine II 
 André Roussin as Roussin

References

Bibliography 
 Rémi Fournier Lanzoni. French Comedy on Screen: A Cinematic History. Palgrave Macmillan, 2014.

External links 
 

1938 films
French comedy films
1938 comedy films
1930s French-language films
Films directed by Marcel Pagnol
Films about filmmaking
Films set in Paris
French black-and-white films
Films scored by Casimir Oberfeld
1930s French films